The Chesapeake Affair was an international diplomatic incident that occurred during the American Civil War.  On December 7, 1863, Confederate sympathizers from the Maritime Provinces captured the American steamer Chesapeake off the coast of Cape Cod. The expedition was planned and led by Vernon Guyon Locke (1827–1890) of Nova Scotia and John Clibbon Brain (1840–1906).  When George Wade of New Brunswick killed one of the American crew, the Confederacy claimed its first fatality in New England waters.   

The Confederate sympathizers had planned to re-coal at Saint John, New Brunswick, and head south to Wilmington, North Carolina.  Instead, the captors had difficulties at Saint John; so they sailed further east and re-coaled in Halifax, Nova Scotia.  U.S. forces responded to the attack, violating British sovereignty by trying to arrest the captors in Nova Scotian waters. International tensions rose.  Wade and others were able to escape through the assistance of William Johnston Almon, a prominent Nova Scotian and Confederate sympathizer.

The Chesapeake Affair was one of the most sensational international incidents that occurred during the American Civil War. The incident briefly threatened to bring the British Empire into the war against the North.

Historical context 
While slavery had effectively ended in Nova Scotia at the beginning of the 19th century, the British ended the practice of slave-owning throughout its Empire by the Slavery Abolition Act 1833.  When the Civil War began, most Canadians and Maritimers were overtly sympathetic to the North, which had abolished slavery after the Revolution and which had trading ties. At the beginning of the war, approximately 20,000 men from British North America, almost half of them  Maritimers, crossed the border to fight, primarily for the North. Many families had strong kinship ties across the border with people in New England, New York and some of the Midwest.

As the war went on, relations between Britain and the North became strained for numerous reasons, and sympathy turned toward the South.  Britain declared itself neutral during the war. Increased trade went through Halifax to both Northern and Southern ports. Nova Scotia's economy thrived throughout the war. This trade created strong ties between Halifax and merchants from both the North and South.  In Halifax the main commercial agent for the Confederacy  was Benjamin Wier and Co. – a company that flew the Confederate flag outside its office and accepted Confederate currency.  The informal headquarters for the Confederates was located at the Waverley Hotel, 1266 Barrington Street (present-day Waverley Inn). At the same time, Halifax became the leading supplier of coal and fish to the North.

While trade with the South was flourishing, the North created a naval blockade to prevent supplies getting to the South.  Hundreds of Blockade runners would use the port of Halifax to ship their goods between Britain and the Confederate States.  Much of the coal and other fuels used to run Confederate steamers went through Halifax.

Canadians and Maritimers became fearful of the power that the North demonstrated in defeating the South, and worried that it might want to annex British North America next. Toronto, Montreal, St. Catharines, and Halifax were centers of a well-financed network of Confederate spies, escaped prisoners, and soldiers of fortune who were trying to influence government opinion in the war. The Confederates arranged various attacks on the Union from Canada, such as the raid on St. Albans, Vermont.  The plan to kill President Abraham Lincoln was made in the  St. Lawrence Hall hotel in Montreal. The Chesapeake Affair was the result of a plan created in Saint John, New Brunswick, by Confederate sympathizers: they intended to capture an American ship and use it as a blockade runner for the South.

Capture 

Locke had arranged for John C. Braine and sixteen Confederate sympathizers from Nova Scotia and New Brunswick to board the Chesapeake as normal passengers in New York.  While en route to Maine, on the night of 7 December, just off the coast of Cape Cod, Braine and his men seized control of the vessel. The crew resisted; in the exchange of gunfire that took place, the ship's second engineer was killed, and three crewmen were wounded. After seizing the vessel, Locke took command at Grand Manan Island.

Neutrality regulations forbade the bringing of prizes into British waters. Locke sailed Chesapeake to Saint John, New Brunswick, as planned but was unable to load coal for the voyage south.  He next took Chesapeake to Nova Scotia. Chesapeake stopped at Shelburne (10 December) and at Conquerall Bank, Nova Scotia, on the LaHave River (14 December), where they loaded some coal. During the next two days, they sold some of the stolen cargo for supplies.

Chesapeake was nearly caught by Malvern on the LaHave River.  Under the cover of night, Chesapeake turned all lights out and slipped behind Spectacle Island and out on the LaHave without being detected. Chesapeake again avoided capture at Lunenburg and traveled on to Halifax.  The vessel moved through Mahone Bay.  At St. Margarets Bay, some crew left the ship. By 16 December, the ship arrived at Mud Cove harbour at Sambro. Once there Locke went to Halifax overland. There he arranged for a schooner come to Sambro with coal.  While Chesapeake was being loaded with coal, Malvern and Dacotah arrived.

Arrest 
Upon the arrival of the American warships, most of the rebel prize crew on Chesapeake fled. Lieutenant Nickels of Malvern violated British sovereignty and international laws by arresting the three men who remained: one from New Brunswick and two from Nova Scotia. George Wade, who had killed a crew member during the raid, was among the prisoners. The Americans took Chesapeake to Halifax to get clearance for their actions from the British authorities. Chesapeake arrived in Halifax on 17 December, escorted by the two American warships.

U.S. Secretary of State William H. Seward informed Britain that the U.S. wanted Chesapeake returned immediately, and the hijackers arrested and extradited to the U.S.

Escape 

William Johnston Almon was generally regarded as the unofficial Confederate consul in Halifax.  He constantly harboured Confederate "refugees" and hosted numerous prominent Confederate officials, who were automatically welcomed at Rosebank during their stay in town.  He was a friend and correspondent of Confederate President Jefferson Davis. He worked with Alexander Keith, Jr. to free the Confederates.

The fate of the Chesapeake awaited adjudication in the colonial Admiralty court, but the British planned to give Confederate prisoner Wade to the United States authorities for extradition.  Almon and Keith arranged for Wade's escape in a rowboat to Ketch Harbour and to Hantsport.  The Americans were outraged and, in response, the British put a warrant out for the rest of his crew.  A few of the crew were tried but were found not guilty on a technicality.

Aftermath 
The Southern sympathisers believed they were engaging in an act of war because they had an official letter of marque from the Confederacy. As the investigation into the affair unfolded, it was found their letter had no legal basis. As a result, rather than the Chesapeake Affair being an official act of war, it was an act of piracy and condemned as such by most of the newspapers in the Maritimes.

Many high-ranking Confederates settled in Canada after the war. Approximately 30 senior Naval and Army officers from the South settled in Halifax.  Among the most prominent were John Wilkinson (commander of CSS Chickamauga), Thomas Edgeworth Courtenay, and John Taylor Wood.

See also 

 Military history of Nova Scotia

References 
Primary texts
 Hoy, Claire. Canadians in the Civil War. McArthur and Company. 2004.
Kert, Faye. The Chesapeake Affair. In Trimming Yankee Sails: Pirates and Privateers of New Brunswick. Goose Lane Editions and The New Brunswick Military Heritage Project. 2005. pp. 63–86. 
Marquis, Greg. In Armageddon's Shadow: The Civil War and Canada's Maritime Provinces. McGill-Queen's University Press. 1998.
 Cox, George H."Sidelights on the Chesapeake Affair, 1863-4" (pp. 124–137); Collections of the Nova Scotia Historical Society Volume 29. 1951,	
 Francis Littlefield. The Capture of the Chesapeake. Collections of the Maine Historical Society, 1901
Endnotes

External links
Marquis, Greg. Halifax and Saint John and the American Civil War. 1998
David Stephen Heidler, Jeanne T. Heidler, David J. Coles. Encyclopedia of the American Civil War, p. 422

Conflicts in Nova Scotia
Foreign relations during the American Civil War
Diplomatic incidents
Maritime incidents in December 1863
International maritime incidents
Political controversies in the United States
History of the foreign relations of the United States
United Kingdom–United States relations
1863 in the United Kingdom
1863 in international relations
Military history of New England
Military history of Nova Scotia
Maritime history of Canada
1863 in the British Empire
1863 in the United States
1863 in Canada
1863 in Nova Scotia